Sofie Marie Parelius (18  September 1823 – 18  September 1902) was a Norwegian stage actress. 
She was known for her ability in comedy and viewed as one of the best Norwegian actor during her time of the classic works of Ludvig Holberg. She belonged to the elite of the actors at the Christiania Theatre in the second half of the 19th-century, when Norwegian actors successively replaced the Danish on Norway's national stage.

Biography
Sofie Parelius was born in Bergen, Norway. She was the daughter of Henrich Kjønning Parelius and Sofie Dahm.

She debuted in 1852 at the Christiania Norwegian Theatre in Oslo. 
She was at Det norske Theater in Bergen in 1857-1860.
She was active at the Christiania Theatre in 1860-1899, and at the Christiania Folketheater under the management of Bjørnstjerne Bjørnson from 1870 to 1872.

Parelius appeared  in the play Peer Gynt by Henrik Ibsen  at the premiere performance at  Christiania Theater on 24 February 1876.

References

Other sources
 Blanc, Tharald Høyerup: Christiania theaters historie 1827-1877, J.W. Cappelen Christiania

1823 births
1902 deaths
Actors from Bergen
19th-century Norwegian actresses